Wellsville is a city in Franklin County, Kansas, United States.  As of the 2020 census, the population of the city was 1,953.

History
Wellsville was platted in 1870.  The community was named after D.L. Wells, a railroad construction engineer.

The first post office in Wellsville was established in October 1870.

On January 9, 1894, baseball star Charlie Bennett went hunting with pitcher John Clarkson. Bennett got off the train in Wellsville to speak to an acquaintance; when he tried to reboard, he slipped and fell under the train's wheels. Bennett lost both legs in the accident. He was fitted with artificial limbs but his baseball career was over; he lived until 1927.

Geography
Wellsville is located at  (38.719694, -95.081358).

Demographics

2010 census
As of the census of 2010, there were 1,857 people, 722 households, and 500 families living in the city. The racial makeup of the city was 95.6% white, 0.7% African American, 0.6% Native American, 0.2% Asian, 0.6% from other races, and 2.4% from two or more races. Hispanic or Latino of any race were 3.2% of the population.

There were 722 households, of which 38.2% had children under the age of 18 living with them, 50.0% were married couples living together, 12.3% had a female householder with no husband present, 6.9% had a male householder with no wife present, and 30.7% were non-families. 26.3% of all households were made up of individuals, and 12.5% had someone living alone who was 65 years of age or older. The average household size was 2.52 and the average family size was 3.02.

The median age in the city was 35.4 years. 27.8% of residents were under the age of 18; 7% were between the ages of 18 and 24; 29.3% were from 25 to 44; 22.6% were from 45 to 64; and 13.3% were 65 years of age or older. The gender makeup of the city was 48.5% male and 51.5% female.

2000 census
As of the census of 2000, there were 1,606 people, 636 households, and 435 families living in the city. The racial makeup of the city was 98.13% white, 0.19% African American, 0.50% Native American, 0.06% Asian, 0.06% from other races, and 1.06% from two or more races. Hispanic or Latino of any race were 0.75% of the population.

There were 636 households, out of which 37.3% had children under the age of 18 living with them, 53.3% were married couples living together, 9.9% had a female householder with no husband present, and 31.6% were non-families. 28.9% of all households were made up of individuals, and 13.5% had someone living alone who was 65 years of age or older. The average household size was 2.45 and the average family size was 3.02.

In the city, the population was spread out, with 28.6% under the age of 18, 8.0% from 18 to 24, 30.3% from 25 to 44, 19.2% from 45 to 64, and 14.0% who were 65 years of age or older. The median age was 34 years. For every 100 females, there were 93.7 males. For every 100 females age 18 and over, there were 88.7 males.

The median income for a household in the city was $38,456, and the median income for a family was $47,102. Males had a median income of $35,938 versus $25,250 for females. The per capita income for the city was $18,215. About 7.9% of families and 7.9% of the population were below the poverty line, including 7.6% of those under age 18 and 13.4% of those age 65 or over.

Education
The community is served by Wellsville USD 289 public school district, which operates three separate schools:
 Wellsville High School
 Wellsville Middle School
 Wellsville Elementary School

Notable people
 Bill Grigsby, sportscaster.
 Elizabeth "Grandma" Layton, artist.
 Mark Samsel, Attorney and Republican Kansas House member.
 Chely Wright, singer, Academy of Country Music award-winning artist.

References

Further reading

External links
 City of Wellsville
 Wellsville - Directory of Public Officials
 USD 289, local school district
 Wellsville city map, KDOT

Cities in Kansas
Cities in Franklin County, Kansas
Populated places established in 1870
1870 establishments in Kansas